The ATR 42 is a regional airliner produced by Franco-Italian manufacturer ATR, with final assembly in Toulouse, France.

On 4 November 1981, the aircraft was launched with ATR, as a joint venture between French Aérospatiale (now Airbus) and Aeritalia (now Leonardo S.p.A.). The number "42" in its name is derived from the aircraft's original standard seating capacity of 42 passengers.

Civilian operators 

In July 2017, 232 ATR 42s were in airline service and 10 were in order backlog: 106 in Americas, 67 in Europe, 38 in Asia, Pacific and the Middle East, and 21 in Africa.

On 1 August 2017 Silver Airways placed orders for 20 ATR 42–600 aircraft, marking the entry of the −600 into the U.S. market, with four in service as of the fourth quarter 2019.

By November 2018, Loganair was to replace its Saab 340s and Saab 2000s, costly to operate and maintain, mostly the 2000, with around 20 ATR 42s over four to five years from the third quarter of 2019.

Military operators 

As of August 2022, 6 ATR 42s were in military service.
 Colombian Navy: 1
 Nigerian Air Force: 2 MPAs
 Myanmar Air Force: 3 special mission aircraft
 Senegalese Air Force: 1

Government operators 
 French Service des avions français instrumentés pour la recherche en environnement: An ATR42-320 used for environmental research purposes (F-HMTO)
 Italian Corps of the Port Captaincies – Coast Guard: 3 MPs
 Italian Guardia di Finanza: 5 MPs
 Senegal Asecna

Former operators 

 Aer Lingus Regional
 Aero Trasporti Italiani
 Aeromar
 Air France Hop - 13 ATR 42-500s.
 Air Lithuania - 3 ATR 42-300s.
 Air Littoral 
 Air Mandalay - 2 ATR 42-300 and 2 ATR 42-320
 American Eagle Airlines
 Bangkok Airways
 Colombian Air Force
 Colombian National Police
 Croatia Airlines
 Gabonese Air Force
 Iran Aseman Airlines - 1 ATR 42-300.
 Israir
 Libyan Air Force (1951–2011): 1 MP
 Línea Turística Aereotuy
 Nordic Regional Airlines
 Nusantara Air Charter
 Polish Air Force leased one ATR 42-300 for six months in 2002.
 Royal Air Maroc - 4 ATR 42-300.
 SBA Airlines - 2 ATR 42-300 and 12 ATR 42-320.
 Si Fly - 3 ATR 42-300.
 Thai Airways
 TransAsia Airways
 West Wind Aviation

References 

42
Cargo aircraft
1980s international airliners
Twin-turboprop tractor aircraft